Blaine Williamson Gabbert (born October 15, 1989) is an American football quarterback who is a free agent. He played college football at Missouri before leaving early for the 2011 NFL Draft after his junior year. He was drafted by the Jacksonville Jaguars in the first round with the 10th overall pick. He has also played for the San Francisco 49ers, Arizona Cardinals, and Tennessee Titans. Gabbert was on the Buccaneers' roster as a backup quarterback when they won Super Bowl LV.

Early years
Gabbert was born in Ballwin, Missouri. He attended Parkway West High School in Ballwin, where he played for the Parkway West Longhorns high school football team. He was a five-star blue-chip All-American and, according to Rivals.com, was their No. 14 national player overall at any position. He was invited to participate in the Elite 11 quarterback camp in the summer of 2007 where he won the camp MVP honors over Andrew Luck and then, in January 2008, he played in the US Army All-American Game. He recorded 623 passing yards and five touchdowns as a senior, despite an injured foot that limited him to four games. As a junior, he posted 1,523 yards and 20 touchdowns (on 119-of-231 passing) and also added another 458 yards rushing and eight touchdowns. In his sophomore season, he threw for approximately 1,100 yards and 11 touchdowns as a first-year starter.

College career
Coming out of high school in 2008, Gabbert was considered a major college recruitment prospect. Rated as a five-star recruit by Rivals.com, Gabbert was listed as the highest ranked pro-style quarterback in the nation. He initially gave a verbal commitment to the University of Nebraska Cornhuskers, but rethought his decision after head coach Bill Callahan was fired. He eventually committed to the University of Missouri. Missouri coach Gary Pinkel decided not to redshirt Gabbert his freshman year, but instead play him as the third-string quarterback behind Chase Daniel and Chase Patton. He saw action in five games in reserve duty, leading the Tiger offense to a touchdown against Colorado and a field goal against Nevada. He completed 5-of-13 passing attempts for 43 yards and rushed six times for 22 yards.

Gabbert had a strong debut in 2009, throwing for 313 yards with three touchdowns in the air and another one on the ground against the Illinois Fighting Illini in the annual Arch Rivalry. He set career highs with 30 completions (30 for 51) and 468 yards against Baylor. The 468 yards were the second-best single-game mark in school history, second only to Jeff Handy's 480 yards against Oklahoma State in 1992. Gabbert was named to second–Team All-Big 12 honors by multiple league media outlets, and he was also granted honorable mention for all-league honors from the AP after ranking 2nd in the Big 12 (29th in the NCAA) in passing efficiency (140.45 rating). Gabbert ranked 4th in the Big 12 and 11th in the NCAA in total offense (292.08 avg.). He led the Big 12 with 8.1 passing yards per attempt. He achieved the 3rd-highest single-season passing total in school history, completing 262-of-445 passes for 3,593 yards, 24 touchdowns, and nine interceptions. He was also recognized for his success in the classroom and named to the 1st-Team Academic All-Big 12.

In 2010, Gabbert led Missouri to a season-opening 23–13 victory over Illinois. He threw for 34 passes on 48 attempts, with 281 yards and two touchdowns. Gabbert also went on to beat Colorado (17/29, 191, two touchdowns) despite being sidelined with an injury in the fourth quarter. Other highlights of the season include beating Texas A&M on the road (31/47, 361, three touchdowns), and upsetting #1 Oklahoma (30/42, 308, one touchdown). That victory ended a seven-game losing streak against the Sooners, going back to 1998. Overall, in his last season with the Tigers, he had 3,186 passing yards, 16 passing touchdowns, nine interceptions, 232 rushing yards, and five rushing touchdowns.

College statistics

Professional career

Jacksonville Jaguars
In January 2011, Gabbert announced that he would forgo his senior year to enter the 2011 NFL Draft.

On April 28, 2011, Gabbert was drafted by the Jacksonville Jaguars in the first round of the 2011 NFL Draft with the 10th overall pick. Jacksonville traded up six spots with the Washington Redskins to select Gabbert. He was the third quarterback to be selected that year, behind Cam Newton and Jake Locker. He is the only quarterback drafted in the first round of that draft class to win a Super Bowl, where he backed up Tom Brady while playing for the Tampa Bay Buccaneers.

2011 season: Rookie year

On July 28, 2011, Gabbert officially signed his contract to play for the team. The deal was worth $12 million over four years.

Though not slated to serve as starting quarterback, Gabbert quickly earned playing time under head coach Jack Del Rio after David Garrard was released in the preseason and Luke McCown performed poorly in the first two games. Gabbert played in his first NFL regular season game on September 18, 2011, against the New York Jets in Week 2. He was then named starter against the Carolina Panthers the following week. In Week 5, against the Cincinnati Bengals, Gabbert threw a 74-yard touchdown pass to Jason Hill. At age 22, Gabbert became the youngest player in league history to start 14 games in a season. He played most of the season with a toe injury on his plant foot.

Gabbert struggled in his rookie season. He was sacked 40 times, the third most by any quarterback in the league. He also fumbled 14 times, most in the league by a quarterback. His 50.8% completion percentage was second-worst in the league for passers with more than 200 attempts (ahead of only Tim Tebow's 46.5%). His 5.4 yards per attempt was last in the league among qualifying passers, as was his 65.4 passer rating. Football Outsiders calculated that Gabbert's 2011 season was "the fifth worst season we've ever measured" in aggregate value. Pete Prisco of CBSSports.com predicted that Gabbert's potential remained high, and that many of his struggles could be attributed to injuries and the unfavorable circumstances around him, including a rush-centered offense, a lack of talented quarterbacks ahead of him, and a weak receiving corps.

2012 season
Going into 2012, Gabbert had a new head coach in Mike Mularkey. Gabbert threw for a then career-high 260 passing yards in the Jaguars' 2012 regular season opener against the Minnesota Vikings, along with two touchdowns and a career-high 96.1 quarterback rating. Despite his strong performance, the Jaguars lost 26–23 in overtime.  In Week 3, a 22–17 victory over the Indianapolis Colts, Gabbert threw a career-high 80-yard touchdown pass to Cecil Shorts. Gabbert struggled in the following weeks, including a loss to the Chicago Bears, in which he threw two interceptions and fumbled once. Both interceptions were returned for touchdowns and the Jaguars lost 41–3. Against the Oakland Raiders, Gabbert tore the labrum in his non-throwing shoulder during the second quarter, and he was replaced by Chad Henne. Before being knocked out of the game, Gabbert completed eight of 12 passes for 110 yards, including a 42-yard touchdown pass. The following week, while playing against the Green Bay Packers, Gabbert passed for over 300 yards for the first time in his career, and completed 27–of–49 attempts for 303 yards in a 24–15 loss.

Gabbert was placed on injured reserve on November 21, 2012, officially ending his season. He was listed as having suffered a right forearm injury. The team cited in an official press release that Gabbert had also been playing with a torn labrum in his left shoulder that would require surgery.

2013 season
Gabbert returned for the 2013 season under new head coach Gus Bradley, but played only three games, finishing with just one touchdown and seven interceptions. He started the season nursing a broken thumb that occurred during a pre-season game. During the season opener, he suffered a lacerated right hand, which required 15 stitches and prevented him from playing the following week against the Oakland Raiders. On October 6, in the third quarter against the St. Louis Rams, Gabbert injured his hamstring, forcing him out of the game.

San Francisco 49ers

2014 season
Gabbert was traded to the San Francisco 49ers on March 11, 2014, for a sixth-round draft pick. Coach Jim Harbaugh made the following remarks about Gabbert joining the team:
"I think he's a very talented player and his career so far hasn't gone on to be what he expected, and maybe others expected it to be. But I believe it can be a really powerful opportunity, powerful motivator for a player to say, 'It wasn't me, it was my situation.' And now he has that opportunity".

Gabbert made his 49ers regular-season debut on October 19, 2014, during the team's 42–17 loss to the Denver Broncos in Week 7. He completed three of seven passes for 38 yards and a touchdown in his only appearance in the 2014 season.

2015 season

On March 10, 2015, the 49ers re-signed Gabbert to a two-year, $2 million deal. Going into the 2015 season, he had a new head coach in Jim Tomsula. On November 2, 2015, he was named starter for the 49ers after Colin Kaepernick was benched. On November 8, 2015, Gabbert made his first start since October 2013, leading the 49ers to a 17–16 victory over the Atlanta Falcons. He completed 15 of 25 passes for 185 yards with two touchdowns and two interceptions. On November 9, 2015, it was announced that Gabbert would remain the starter when the 49ers played the Seattle Seahawks on November 22. The 49ers lost 29–13, with Gabbert completing 22 of 34 passes for 264 yards and a touchdown with a 98.2 passer rating. With the 49ers down 20–13 against the Chicago Bears late in the fourth quarter on December 6, 2015, Gabbert rushed for a 44-yard touchdown, the first rushing touchdown of his career. He then threw a 71-yard game-winning touchdown to Torrey Smith in overtime for a 26–20 49ers victory. Gabbert finished the 2015 season with 2,031 passing yards with ten touchdowns and seven interceptions for an 86.2 passer rating. In eight games as a starter, he had a 3–5 record.

2016 season
On September 3, 2016, Gabbert was named the starting quarterback for the season opener over Colin Kaepernick. In Week 2, against the Carolina Panthers, he threw a 75-yard touchdown pass to tight end Vance McDonald in the 46–27 loss. After starting the first five games of the season, he went 1–4 which led to their coach, Chip Kelly, starting Colin Kaepernick. Later in the season, he temporarily replaced Kaepernick. After a poor performance in Week 12, he was benched again. He was replaced by Christian Ponder as the main backup. Overall, in the 2016 season, he finished with 925 passing yards, five passing touchdowns, and six interceptions to go along with 173 rushing yards and two rushing touchdowns.

Arizona Cardinals

On May 10, 2017, Gabbert signed a one-year contract with the Arizona Cardinals. He started the season as the third-string quarterback behind Carson Palmer and Drew Stanton under head coach Bruce Arians. He was named the Week 11 starter after Palmer and Stanton suffered injuries. During the game, Gabbert threw for 257 yards and a career-high three touchdowns as the Cardinals lost to the Houston Texans by a score of 31–21. Gabbert remained the starter in a 27–24 win over the Jacksonville Jaguars. He threw for 241 yards with two touchdowns and an 83.3 passer rating against his former team. On December 18, 2017, Gabbert was benched as the Cardinals' starting quarterback in favor of Stanton after not throwing for a touchdown in back-to-back games. In five games in the 2017 season, he finished with 1,086 passing yards, six touchdowns, and six interceptions.

Tennessee Titans
On March 27, 2018, Gabbert signed a two-year contract with the Tennessee Titans. On September 9, 2018, in the season-opener against the Miami Dolphins, Gabbert entered the game after starter Marcus Mariota suffered an elbow injury. Gabbert completed 11 of 22 passes for 117 yards and an interception as the Titans lost by a score of 27–20. Due to Mariota's injury, Gabbert started the game against the Houston Texans on September 16, completing 13 of 20 passes for 117 yards and a touchdown as the Titans won by a score of 20–17. Gabbert also started in Week 3 against his former team, the Jacksonville Jaguars. During that game, he struggled and was limited to eight passing yards before leaving the 9–6 road victory with a concussion. Due to another injury to Mariota, Gabbert started the final game of the 2018 season with a Wild Card playoff spot on the line. In the game against the Indianapolis Colts, Gabbert passed for 165 yards, one touchdown, and two interceptions. The Titans lost 33–17 and missed the playoffs.

On March 15, 2019, Gabbert was released by the Titans after they acquired quarterback Ryan Tannehill in a trade with the Miami Dolphins.

Tampa Bay Buccaneers
On March 27, 2019, Gabbert signed with the Tampa Bay Buccaneers, reuniting him with head coach Bruce Arians, who was his head coach with the Arizona Cardinals. On September 24, 2019, Gabbert was placed on injured reserve with a dislocated shoulder.

On April 2, 2020, Gabbert re-signed with the Buccaneers on a one-year deal, serving as the backup to the newly signed Tom Brady. During a Week 16 blowout win against the Detroit Lions, Gabbert relieved Brady at the start of the second half and subsequently completed nine of 16 passes for 143 yards and two additional touchdowns to secure a 47–7 win.

On February 7, 2021, Gabbert served as backup-quarterback behind Tom Brady in Super Bowl LV, where they would go on to defeat the Kansas City Chiefs by a score of 31–9 giving Gabbert a Super Bowl ring.

On May 10, 2021, the Buccaneers re-signed Gabbert.

On April 6, 2022, the Buccaneers once again re-signed Gabbert.

NFL career statistics

Regular season

Personal life
Gabbert enjoys deep-sea and fly fishing in his free time. He has two brothers. Tyler Gabbert, committed to Nebraska, like Blaine, only to decommit and commit to Missouri. He never played for the Tigers and transferred to UCF. His youngest brother is Brett Gabbert, the backup quarterback for the Miami University RedHawks.

On December 29, 2022 while riding jet skis, the Gabbert brothers helped save four individuals in the water near Davis Islands and Peter O. Knight Airport after an emergency landing of a helicopter.  Blaine says he saw what “looked like a crew boat in the water that had broken up in about four pieces and I vaguely remember seeing like two yellow life jackets.”  The three brothers checked it out and called 911.  They helped three persons out of the water and onto their jet skis.  Arriving Tampa Bay police officers helped the fourth person out of the water.  Buccaneers Coach Todd Bowles described the rescue as “outstanding.”

References

External links

 
  
 
Tampa Bay Buccaneers bio

1989 births
Living people
American football quarterbacks
Arizona Cardinals players
Jacksonville Jaguars players
Missouri Tigers football players
People from Ballwin, Missouri
Players of American football from Missouri
Players of American football from Tampa, Florida
San Francisco 49ers players
Sportspeople from Columbia, Missouri
Sportspeople from St. Louis County, Missouri
Tampa Bay Buccaneers players
Tennessee Titans players